Waverly Historic District or Waverley Historic District may refer to:

 Waverley Historic District (Enid, Oklahoma), listed on the National Register of Historic Places (NRHP) 
 Waverly Historic District (Waverly Township, Pennsylvania), listed on the NRHP
 Waverly Historic District (Columbia, South Carolina), listed on the NRHP

See also
Waverly (disambiguation)
Waverley (disambiguation)